Tales from the Strip is the ninth L.A. Guns studio album, released in 2005.

It is the second album of L.A. Guns with guitarist Stacey Blades, the first being the cover album Rips the Covers Off released the previous year.

Track listing
"It Don't Mean Nothing" - 5:06
"Electric Neon Sunset" - 4:40
"Gypsy Soul" - 3:04
"Original Sin" - 4:25
"Vampire" - 4:22
"Hollywood's Burning" - 3:44
"6.9 Earthshaker" (Instrumental) - 4:06
"Rox Baby Girl" - 4:12
"Crazy Motorcycle" - 4:19
"Skin" - 3:11
"Shame" - 4:53
"Resurrection" - 3:45
"Amanecer" - 3:12
"(Can't Give You) Anything Better Than Love" - 4:45

Personnel
 Phil Lewis - lead vocals
 Stacey Blades - guitar
 Adam Hamilton - bass guitar
 Steve Riley - drums

References

L.A. Guns albums
2005 albums
Shrapnel Records albums